Saint Claudius of Vienne was a bishop of Vienne in the Dauphiné, France, in the first half of the fifth century. He is considered a saint of the Roman Catholic Church.

He attended the Council of Orange in 441 and the Council of Vaison in 442.

Salvianus dedicated his work, now lost, on Ecclesiastes to Claudius.

His feast day is celebrated on 1 June. He is further celebrated on 1 July on the collective feast of all the bishop saints of Vienne with Saint Martin.

References 

Year of birth unknown
Year of death unknown
4th-century births
5th-century deaths
Bishops of Vienne
5th-century Christian saints
Gallo-Roman saints